The 1991 California Golden Bears football team represented the University of California, Berkeley in the 1991 NCAA Division I-A football season. California played their home games at Memorial Stadium.  Led by head coach Bruce Snyder and quarterback Mike Pawlawski, the Golden Bears won the Florida Citrus Bowl, 37–13, finished with a 10–2 record, and climbed from being unranked in the preseason to being ranked eighth in the final AP Poll. California scored 443 points and allowed 239 points in 12 games.

The team's statistical leaders included Mike Pawlawski with 2,517 passing yards, Russell White with 1,177 rushing yards, and Sean Dawkins with 723 receiving yards.

During their opening game against the Pacific Tigers, California scored so often that the California Victory Cannon on Tightwad Hill ran out of ammunition. This game remains the only such instance in the cannon's history.

Schedule

Roster

Rankings

Season summary

Pacific
Mike Pawlawski 6 TD passes
Russell White 111 rushing yards

Team players in the NFL
The following players were claimed in the 1992 NFL Draft.

Awards and honors

References

California
California Golden Bears football seasons
Citrus Bowl champion seasons
California Golden Bears football